AII may refer to:

 Agence de l'innovation industrielle (est. 2005) a French governmental agency which supports technological projects
 Assyrian Neo-Aramaic (ISO 639 language code: aii)
 Ali-Sabieh Airport (IATA airport code: AII; ICAO airport code: HDAS), Ali-Sabieh, Djibouti
 Air Integra (ICAO airline code: AII), see List of airline codes (A)
 Ajmer Junction railway station (rail code: AII), Jaipur Road, Patel Nagar, Topdara, Ajmer district, Rajasthan, India
 Angiotensin II (angiotensin 2)
 AII amacrine cells
 American Idol (season 1), AI-I

See also

 
 
 AI1
 A11 (disambiguation)
 All (disambiguation)
 Ail (disambiguation)
 Ali (disambiguation)
 AL1 (disambiguation)
 II (disambiguation)
 AA (disambiguation)
 AI (disambiguation)
 A2 (disambiguation)
 IAI (disambiguation)
 IIA (disambiguation)